Sharrow is a district of Sheffield, England.

Sharrow may also refer to:

Sharrow (lane marking), a nickname for shared lane markings
Sharrow, Alberta

People with the surname
Jimmy Sharrow (born 1985), American ice hockey player
Leonard Sharrow (1915–2004), American classical bassoonist

See also

Sharow, a village and civil parish in North Yorkshire, England
Sharrow Bay Country House